Parastenheliidae is a family of copepods belonging to the order Harpacticoida.

Genera:
 Foweya Gee, 2006
 Karllangia Noodt, 1964
 Paraleptomesochra Wells, 1967
 Parastenhelia Thompson & Scott, 1903
 Pawulobathynella
 Psammoleptomesochra Mielke, 1994

References

Copepods